Brian Whittaker (23 September 1956 – 7 September 1997) was a Scottish professional footballer who played for Partick Thistle, Celtic,  Heart of Midlothian and Falkirk.

Career
Left-back Whittaker came to prominence whilst playing over 350 games for Partick Thistle in all competitions between 1974 and 1983, eventually becoming one of manager David Hay's first signings for Celtic in August 1983 for a fee of £50,000.

In May 1984 he was sold to Hearts for £25,000 and spent six years as a player at Tynecastle Park. Whittaker was an integral part of the Hearts team which was pipped to the league title by Celtic in the last minutes of the 1985–86 Scottish Premier Division season, and also played on the losing side in the losing 1986 Scottish Cup Final.

Whittaker spent some time at Falkirk before returning to Hearts as a coach, then moving on to working as an agent. He was killed in a car crash on Sunday 7 September 1997.

Honours
'''Heart of Midlothian
 Scottish Cup: runner-up 1986

References

External links
 
 http://www.timesonline.co.uk/tol/sport/article550065.ece
 http://www.londonhearts.com/scores/players/whittakerbrian.html

1956 births
1997 deaths
Footballers from Glasgow
Association football fullbacks
Scottish footballers
Partick Thistle F.C. players
Celtic F.C. players
Heart of Midlothian F.C. players
Falkirk F.C. players
Scottish Football League players
Road incident deaths in Scotland
Scottish Football League representative players
Association football coaches
Heart of Midlothian F.C. non-playing staff